Sergio Sabatino (born 20 April 1988) is an Italian professional footballer who plays as a defender for Lamezia Terme.

Club career
On 16 August 2021, he signed with Fidelis Andria. On 10 January 2022, his contract with Fidelis Andria was terminated by mutual consent. On the same day, he joined Lamezia Terme in Serie D.

References

External links

1988 births
Living people
People from Corleone
Sportspeople from the Province of Palermo
Italian footballers
Association football defenders
Serie C players
Serie D players
Eccellenza players
Manfredonia Calcio players
Taranto F.C. 1927 players
Trapani Calcio players
A.S.G. Nocerina players
U.S. Catanzaro 1929 players
U.S. Savoia 1908 players
S.S. Arezzo players
S.S. Akragas Città dei Templi players
U.S. Triestina Calcio 1918 players
A.S.D. Sicula Leonzio players
A.C.R. Messina players
S.S. Fidelis Andria 1928 players
F.C. Lamezia Terme players
Footballers from Sicily